Pitcairnia burle-marxii is a plant species of the bromeliad genus Pitcairnia. This species is endemic to Brazil.

Cultivars
 Pitcairnia 'Flaming Arrow'

References

BSI Cultivar Registry Retrieved 11 October 2009

burle-marxii
Flora of Brazil